Shuvayata is a rural locality (a village) in Frolovskoye Rural Settlement, Permsky District, Perm Krai, Russia. The population was 21 as of 2010. There are 6 streets.

Geography 
Shuvayata is located 13 km south of Perm (the district's administrative centre) by road. Zamarayevo is the nearest rural locality.

References 

Rural localities in Permsky District